The Institute of Applied Economic Research (Portuguese: Instituto de Pesquisa Econômica Aplicada, Ipea) is a Brazilian government-led research organization dedicated to generation of macroeconomical, sectorial and thematic studies in order to base government planning and policy making.

It was created as EPEA in 1964 with as its first director Joao Paulo dos Reis Velloso, who later became Minister of Planning. It received support in its early years from the so-called Berkeley Group under the leadership of Albert Fishlow. As of January 2005, it had about 560 employees. It maintains libraries in Brasilia and Rio de Janeiro.

References

External links
Official Website
IPEAData, a database with data collected by IPEA from many sources

Economic research institutes
Research institutes in Brazil
Government-owned companies of Brazil